Roberto Ramírez (born 7 July 1996) is an Argentine professional footballer who plays as a goalkeeper for Quilmes, on loan from Argentine Primera División side Godoy Cruz.

Career
Ramírez joined Argentine Primera División side Godoy Cruz in 2009. He first appeared on a first-team teamsheet in 2013–14 as he went unused in games against Newell's Old Boys and Racing Club. After two further substitute bench appearances in 2015, Ramírez made his professional debut in 2016–17 in a 1–0 victory over Huracán on 26 August 2017. In June 2022, Ramírez joined Primera Nacional side Quilmes on loan for the rest of the year.

Career statistics
.

References

External links

1996 births
Living people
Sportspeople from Mendoza, Argentina
Argentine footballers
Association football goalkeepers
Argentine Primera División players
Primera Nacional players
Godoy Cruz Antonio Tomba footballers
Quilmes Atlético Club footballers